The Hale Creek Bridge is a historic bridge carrying County Road 271 (aka Fletcher Road) over Hale Creek in Sevier County, Arkansas, near the village of Red Wing and about halfway between De Queen and Dierks. When the bridge was built in 1919, the roadway it carried was the major east–west route in the area. In 1926 this route was designated U.S. Route 70. It retained this designation until the current alignment of US 70 was built in 1952. The bridge is a fine local example of a Pratt truss bridge.

The bridge was listed on the National Register of Historic Places in 2004.

See also
National Register of Historic Places listings in Sevier County, Arkansas
List of bridges on the National Register of Historic Places in Arkansas

References

Road bridges on the National Register of Historic Places in Arkansas
Bridges completed in 1919
Transportation in Sevier County, Arkansas
National Register of Historic Places in Sevier County, Arkansas
Pratt truss bridges in the United States
Metal bridges in the United States
U.S. Route 70
1919 establishments in Arkansas
Bridges of the United States Numbered Highway System